The 2016 Web.com Tour was the 27th season of the top developmental tour for the PGA Tour in men's golf, and the fifth under the current sponsored name of Web.com Tour. It ran from January 28 to September 25. The season was to consist of 25 official money tournaments, six of them played outside of the United States, but the season-ending Web.com Tour Championship was canceled due to Hurricane Matthew.

Schedule
The following table lists official events during the 2016 season.

Location of tournaments

Money leaders
For full rankings, see 2016 Web.com Tour Finals graduates.

Regular season money leaders
The regular season money list was based on prize money won during the season, calculated in U.S. dollars. The top 25 players on the tour earned status to play on the 2016–17 PGA Tour.

Finals money leaders
A further 25 players earned status to play on the 2016–17 PGA Tour, via the Web.com Tour Finals.

Awards

Notes

References

External links
Official schedule

Korn Ferry Tour seasons
Web.com Tour